The Andaman and Nicobar football team is an Indian football team representing Andaman and Nicobar Islands in Indian state football competitions including the Santosh Trophy.

Team 
The following 22 players were called for the 2022–23 Santosh Trophy.

References 

Santosh Trophy teams
Football in the Andaman and Nicobar Islands